Arsela Peak is the peak rising to 1517 m near the south end of Owen Ridge, the southernmost portion of the main ridge of Sentinel Range in Ellsworth Mountains, Antarctica.  It has precipitous and partly ice-free north and southwest slopes, and surmounts lower Nimitz Glacier to the southwest and the end of Wessbecher Glacier to the northeast.

The peak is named after the Thracian settlement of Arsela in Southern Bulgaria.

Location
US mapping in 1961 and 1988.

See also
 Mountains in Antarctica

Maps
 Vinson Massif.  Scale 1:250 000 topographic map.  Reston, Virginia: US Geological Survey, 1988.
 Antarctic Digital Database (ADD). Scale 1:250000 topographic map of Antarctica. Scientific Committee on Antarctic Research (SCAR). Since 1993, regularly updated.

Notes

References
 Arsela Peak. SCAR Composite Gazetteer of Antarctica.
 Bulgarian Antarctic Gazetteer. Antarctic Place-names Commission. (details in Bulgarian, basic data in English)

External links
 Arsela Peak. Copernix satellite image

Ellsworth Mountains
Bulgaria and the Antarctic
Mountains of Ellsworth Land